Who Dares Wins is a 1982 British political thriller film directed by Ian Sharp and starring Lewis Collins, Judy Davis, Richard Widmark, Tony Doyle and Edward Woodward The title is the motto of the British Army’s elite Special Air Service (SAS).

The plot is based largely on the Iranian Embassy siege of 1980 in London, when a team from the SAS made a sudden assault on the building to rescue those being held hostage inside. As producer, Euan Lloyd was inspired to make the film by visiting the scene during the siege and watching live coverage of it on television, moving quickly to prevent someone else developing the same idea. An initial synopsis was created by George Markstein. This was then turned into a novel by James Follett, as The Tiptoe Boys, in 30 days. Meanwhile, chapter-by-chapter as the novel was completed, it was posted to Reginald Rose in Los Angeles, who wrote the final screenplay. The film was released in the United States as The Final Option.

Plot
A demonstration by unilateral nuclear disarmament protesters from the Campaign for Nuclear Disarmament (CND) in London is interrupted when one of the protesters is  killed. British security forces learn that a terrorist group attached to CND has been planning a significant act of terrorism for the near future. The person killed during the protest demonstration was an undercover intelligence officer who had infiltrated the terrorist group. The commanding officer of the Special Air Service, Colonel Hadley, suggests a new line of inquiry for the investigation.

Two foreign officers arrive to train at the SAS's headquarters: Captain Hagen is a member of the US Army Rangers and Captain Freund is a member of the West German GSG 9. They are taken to the close quarter battle house and witness an SAS room entry assault. Colonel Hadley introduces them to the SAS man playing the hostage, Captain Peter Skellen, and informs them they will be with Skellen's troop, consisting of Baker, Dennis, and Williamson. During an exercise in the Brecon Beacons, Hadley and Major Steele discover Skellen's troop torturing Hagen and Freund. Skellen is dismissed from the Regiment. The torture and dismissal are a ruse to repaint Skellen as a disgraced former SAS operative, and Hagen and Freund as innocent victims in the scheme.

Skellen's intelligence contact, Ryan, advises him to meet Frankie Leith and Rod Walker, the two people who lead the People's Lobby, the terrorist group believed to be planning the act of terrorism. Skellen tells his wife that he will be going away for a while on a mission. A foreign man, Andrey Malek, arranges with a city banker for the distribution of large sums of money to organisations including the People's Lobby. Skellen arranges to meet Leith at a bar frequented by People's Lobby members, and initiates a sexual relationship with her, to the annoyance of Walker and his underlings, Helga and Mac. Leith takes Skellen to the organisation's lair and introduces him to the group. Leith appreciates Skellen's SAS background, and offers him a job as security consultant to the People's Lobby; she also allows him to move in with her.

To strengthen Skellen's cover story, Hadley informs Hagen and Freund of Skellen's location; the wronged men attack Skellen at Leith's home and inflict a severe beating. As a result, Leith's few remaining doubts about Skellen dissipate, but Walker and his cronies still are not fully convinced. Helga observes Skellen meeting the same unknown individual (Ryan) in various locations. Their scrutiny intensifies when Walker and his associates witness Skellen's meeting with his wife and daughter. They use photos from their surveillance to convince Leith that Skellen is not all he seems. Walker orders Helga to kill Ryan, cutting Skellen's link to Hadley. Hadley has no choice but to trust Skellen's abilities to uncover the group's plans and escape alive. He orders police protection for Skellen's family.

Despite his official advisory capacity, Skellen is denied details about the upcoming People's Lobby operation. On the day of the operation, Leith and Walker instruct Helga and Mac to take Skellen's family hostage. Helga and Mac overpower the policeman on guard duty outside the Skellen home, bundling him inside as an additional hostage with Skellen's wife and child. Leith uses this to blackmail Skellen into unconditional co-operation.

The terrorists and Skellen arrive at the US Ambassador's residence in a hijacked coach. Wearing stolen US Air Force uniforms, they gain entry to the secure compound and take hostages of the US Ambassador, the US Secretary of State, the Commander-in-Chief of Strategic Air Command (SAC), and the British Foreign Secretary, along with their wives and the residence staff. Hadley and his police counterpart, Commander Powell, arrive at the residence to receive the demands of the terrorists: unless a US nuclear missile is launched at Holy Loch naval base, all the hostages will be killed. Currie questions Leith's motivations, and Leith responds that her ultimate goal is the total disarmament of the whole world. This opens a debate about method and political philosophy that only antagonises the terrorists.

Meanwhile, Dennis and three fellow SAS troopers arrive at Skellen's home. They set up in the attached house next door, using audio and video devices to covertly observe Helga, Mac, and their captives through the wall.

Skellen manages to separate himself from the group by feigning a need for the toilet. He uses a shaving mirror to heliograph floodlights and signal Hadley via Morse code, telling him to attack at 10 a.m. while Skellen creates a diversion. Hadley cannot get permission for an SAS attack because the British Home Secretary insists that Powell resolve the situation through negotiation. As the tension mounts inside the residence, a mistake by one of the terrorists causes the death of the SAC C-in-C. This enables Powell and Hadley to get the permission for their assault.

The SAS operatives in the house adjoining Skellen's remove a large area of the bricks separating the attached houses. Meanwhile, Helga's temper at the Skellens' crying baby escalates into a fight with Skellen's wife. The operatives work fast to attach a charge to the exposed wall, cut the lights and blow the wall so two SAS soldiers can shoot through the gap, killing both Helga and Mac.

As the SAS mount an assault on the residence, the terrorists panic. Skellen overpowers and kills three terrorists. The SAS, deploying from helicopters, force open doors and enter through windows. As they methodically clear the residence, Skellen kills more terrorists including Walker. Skellen joins with Baker and his troop to search for Leith, as the other troopers bundle the hostages to safety. When Skellen hesitates to kill Leith on sight, Major Steele kills her before she can kill Skellen.

The Ambassador thanks the troopers as they leave the residence. Skellen and his troop apologise to Hagen and Freund, explain the reason for their actions, and make peace. Skellen departs on one of the helicopters with his colleagues.

In a government building, Sir Richard, a politician, complains to a colleague about the violent end to the siege. He then meets the financier Malek, and they discuss future similar actions.

An on-screen list of terrorist incidents appears over the closing credits, accompanied by a rendition of The Red Flag.

Cast
 Lewis Collins as Captain Peter Skellen, SAS
 Judy Davis as Frankie Leith
 Richard Widmark as Secretary of State Arthur Currie
 Edward Woodward as Commander Powell, Metropolitan Police
 Robert Webber as General Ira Potter
 Tony Doyle as Colonel J. Hadley, SAS commander
 John Duttine as Rod Walker
 Kenneth Griffith as the Very Reverend Horace W. Crick, the Bishop of Camden
 Rosalind Lloyd as Jenny Skellen
 Ingrid Pitt as Helga
 Norman Rodway as Ryan
 Maurice Roëves as Major Steele
 Bob Sherman as Captain Hagen, US Army Rangers
 Albert Fortell as Captain Freund, GSG9
 Mark Ryan as Mac
 Peter Turner as Terrorist
 Patrick Allen as Police Commissioner
 Trevor Byfield as SAS trooper Steve Baker
 Nick Brimble as SAS trooper Williamson
 Anna Ford as Newsreader
 Aharon Ipalé as Andrey Malek
 Paul Freeman as Sir Richard
 Oz Clarke as Special Branch Man

Production

Development
Euan Lloyd gained the idea for the film from events surrounding the siege of the Iranian embassy in London, most notably the storming of the building on 5 May 1980 by the SAS. Living just half a mile from the embassy, he visited it on multiple occasions during the four days it was occupied by terrorists, witnessing the dramatic ending to the siege in person. That same evening he called his lawyer in New York and asked him to register 5 titles with the Motion Picture Association of America, one of which was SAS: Who Dares Wins. In a slightly abbreviated form, this became the name of the film based on the incident which he then set out to make.

"Since John Wayne and Jack Warner have left the scene its become unfashionable to wave the flag", said Lloyd. He hoped the film would counterbalance the anti-authority message of films like The China Syndrome, War Games, Missing and Gandhi.

"I watched in awe at what these SAS men did, and truly I felt very proud", Lloyd said. "Terrorism worries me greatly, so here was an opportunity for me to say what I've felt for a long time."

Lloyd contacted friend, writer and former intelligence officer, George Markstein and commissioned a treatment. They decided to end the film with an embassy siege, but to make the film more relevant to US audiences they changed it to the US embassy. They also changed Iranian extremists to anti-nuclear protesters. Markstein wrote a treatment in a week, then Lloyd gave the job of writing a script to Reginald Rose. According to director Ian Sharp he was "handed a script that needed a lot work". Sharp flew to the United States to work on the script with Rose, but they "never got to a really strong plot." The action scenes were rewritten by Sharp. The budget was raised by pre-selling the film to multiple territories.

Lloyd's investors were willing to go with a lesser name actor as star. The producer considered a number of options before going with Lewis Collins, then best known for The Professionals TV show. Collins trained intensively for the part.

Judy Davis was cast on the strength of her performance in My Brilliant Career. She said she did not base her character on Patty Hearst as she felt Hearst was ultimately not serious about politics; she was inspired by Bommi Baumann and his book Terror or love?

Filming
The production began in September 1981. The film had advisers who had worked in the SAS which led to some concerns from the Ministry of Defence that the film could breach the Official Secrets Act. However, Lloyd said the ministry eventually gave its "tacit approval" to the film after two small changes to the story were made; "after that they opened the door quite widely and even provided three military helicopters", the producer said.

According to the DVD commentary, the film was made with the help of the 22 SAS Regiment at Hereford, although their commanding officer Peter de la Billière had initially refused to help in a pre-production meeting with Euan Lloyd. Director Ian Sharp, who was hired due to Lloyd's liking of his direction in the TV series The Professionals, was invited to SAS headquarters at Stirling Lines where he met some of the troops who assaulted the Iranian embassy. With the co-operation of the SAS achieved, production moved ahead swiftly.

During one of his visits to Stirling Lines, Sharp had met a Fijian trooper who had a mishap during the Iranian embassy assault. The trooper told how he got caught up in his descent and his uniform caught fire due to the explosives used for their forced entry. Inspired by this, Sharp had a similar scene inserted.

The first scenes were shot in Portobello Road market in January 1982. The concert, speech and subsequent fight were staged at the Union Chapel in Islington, London. Skellen's house and the hostage taking was shot in Kynance Mews in South Kensington.

When it came time to shoot the SAS assault on the US Ambassador’s residence, the crew had prepared the helicopters and stuntmen but the SAS offered to do the scene instead. Sharp accepted as he thought the look they gave could not be replicated by the crew.

The action sequences were arranged by veteran James Bond stuntman Bob Simmons.

"The film isn't a serious psychological study of a terrorist's mind, but it has been a good meaty part", said Judy Davis. According to an interview with director Ian Sharp, Judy Davis wanted the dialogue scene between her terrorist character and Richard Widmark's Secretary of State rewritten."She wanted her character to counter some of the things Widmark says to her. I wasn’t about to rewrite a scene of that magnitude that was already that well-written. I didn’t think her suggestions made any sense anyhow. Behind her objections lurked an actor’s ego."

Filming wrapped after seven weeks. Lloyd started to organise the publicity campaign, but like his previous film The Wild Geese, rumour had started to spread that the film was a right-wing propaganda film attacking the CND organisation.

Soundtrack

The score was composed by Roy Budd, while the song Right on Time, which is heard during the church scene was written by Jerry and Marc Donahue.

Reception

Controversy 
At the premiere people protested the film because it allegedly painted the Campaign for Nuclear Disarmament as terrorists. In a 2021 interview, director Ian Sharp said: "This is one of the confusing things (...) In the film the point is that the CND is infiltrated by the terrorists. They are using a legitimate cause for their terrorism. When they are doing their machine gunning practice, they’re using CND symbols to shoot at, to show their contempt. I don’t know how they missed all the signs." In the same interview he conceded: "It’s probably my own fault. It was clear to me, but I misjudged it."

Box-office
The film was the sixth-highest grosser at the UK box office in 1982. (Another source put it 10th highest.)

Critical
Film critic Roger Ebert of the Chicago Sun-Times said: "There are so many errors of judgment, strategy, behavior and simple plausibility in this movie that we just give up and wait for it to end. You know you're in trouble when the movie's audience knows more about terrorism than the terrorists do." 

Who Dares Wins was panned by some critics as being right-wing. Sight & Sound described the film as "hawkish". Derek Malcolm in The Guardian called the film "truly dreadful".

The Washington Post enjoyed the final assault, describing it as "a pip", and praised the authenticity of the action sequences, but thought "an awful lot of talky, slack footage accumulates before this whirlwind payoff" and that the "storytelling rhythm is defective."

Within days of the film's release, producer Lloyd received a phone call from Stanley Kubrick praising the film and calling the casting of Judy Davis "inspirational". This claim has been strongly contested by Kubrick's assistant Anthony Frewin, saying that, "Lloyd, as the gunnery [sergeant] in Full Metal Jacket would say, is blowing smoke up our asses. That film is the antithesis of everything Stanley stood for and believed in."

Reagan administration
Soon after the film was completed, copies of it were requested for viewing by the White House; it was seen by Ronald Reagan and his advisers at Camp David and they reportedly enjoyed the film. It was also enjoyed by Alexander Haig, Reagan's former Secretary of State, who had recently joined the board of MGM/UA. On his recommendation, MGM/UA bought the film for distribution in the US, retitling it The Final Option.

In an interview, Haig praised the film as a "terribly exciting drama... a realistic portrayal of the world in which we live."

Proposed follow-up
Euan Lloyd signed Lewis Collins to a three-picture contract on the basis of his performance. The films were to be The Wild Geese 2, Battle for the Falklands (about the Special Boat Service during the Falklands war) and Macau. Collins ended up not appearing in the first film and the other two were never made.

References

External links
 
 
 
 
 Unofficial Lewis Collins fansite
Review of film at Variety

1982 films
1982 action thriller films
British action thriller films
Films about terrorism
Films directed by Ian Sharp
Films about hostage takings
Films about the Special Air Service
Films shot at Pinewood Studios
1980s political thriller films
Films with screenplays by Reginald Rose
Films scored by Roy Budd
1980s English-language films
1980s British films